Napangardi is a surname. Notable people with the surname include:

Dorothy Napangardi (early 1950s-2013), Australian artist
Judy Watson Napangardi (c.1925–2016), Australian artist
Lily Kelly Napangardi (born c.1948), Australian artist
Pansy Napangardi (born 1948), Australian artist